Tássia Reis, artistic name of Tássia dos Reis Santos (Jacareí, August 16, 1989), is a Brazilian rapper, singer and songwriter.

One of the first female rappers of new Brazilian music, Reis started her career with the EP "Tássia Reis" in 2014. Then came the debut album "Outra Esfera" in 2016. With the two materials released, came the national hits "No Seu Radinho" and "Se Avexe Não." 

In 2019, she released her second album, "Próspera". The album was critically acclaimed and considered one of the best albums of the year by APCA.

The main themes of their songs are life, self-knowledge, love and breaking patterns.

Discography

Albums 
 Próspera
 Tássia Reis
 Outra Esfera

Songs 
 No Seu Radinho
 Se Avexe Não

References

Afro-Brazilian women singers
Hip hop singers
21st-century women rappers
Contemporary R&B singers
Brazilian pop singers
Brazilian women rappers
1989 births
Living people
People from Jacareí
Musicians from São Paulo (state)